Colegio El Camino Los Cabos, BCS is a bilingual, non profit, non sectarian private school located at the base of Pedregal Cabo San Lucas in Los Cabos, Baja California Sur, Mexico. The headmaster for the school is Mr. Heath Sparrow

It is an International Baccalaureate (IB) accredited K-12 private school and is associated with Cognia.

References 

Cabo San Lucas
Education in Baja California Sur
Private schools in Mexico
International Baccalaureate schools in Mexico